Resident Evil Gaiden is an action-adventure game for the Game Boy Color developed by Capcom and M4, and first released on December 14, 2001. Receiving generally mixed reviews by critics, the game marks a departure from other entries in the series, insofar as areas are explored with the playable character seen from a top-down perspective and with battles fought in first-person view. The story revolves around a viral outbreak on a passenger ship and has Leon S. Kennedy and Barry Burton return as protagonists. This game is non-canon, as its plot is contradicted by the main series in key parts, and its events are ignored.

Gameplay

The game features three playable characters and consists of exploring areas, collecting items and combating enemies in the process. Unlike previous entries in the series, Resident Evil Gaiden assumes a top-down perspective for the environment portions that, upon approaching an enemy, changes to a first-person combat mode with a reticle constantly moving to the left and right. To attack, the player has to press the action button while the reticle is in range of the enemy.

Plot
The title depicts a viral outbreak on a luxurious passenger ship. It introduces an underground organization established to put an end to the global operations of Umbrella, the company responsible for the Raccoon City disaster. Leon S. Kennedy, one of the protagonists of Resident Evil 2, joined the initiative and received orders to investigate the ocean liner, Starlight, which is rumored to be carrying a new type of bio-organic weapon (BOW) developed by Umbrella Corporation. Eventually, the headquarters loses contact with him and Barry Burton, a support character from the original Resident Evil, is sent in to find his whereabouts.

After discovering that the crew and the passengers on the ship have turned into zombies, he crosses the path with an orphan girl named Lucia, who, for some reason, can sense the presence of Umbrella's new BOW and also possesses some other mysterious abilities. Lucia is then kidnapped by the monster, but Barry eventually reunites with Leon and they cooperate to put the BOW to flight and save her. The group learns that the monster is supposed to have green blood and, afterwards, witnesses an explosion set the ship on fire. They split up and Leon and Lucia activate the sprinkler system to prevent the engine room from blowing up. Later, the two overhear Barry communicating with Umbrella to arrange some sort of trade-off, their suspicions confirmed upon meeting him again. Barry threatens Leon with his gun, kidnaps Lucia and escapes to an Umbrella submarine with her. Meanwhile, a second explosion hits the Starlight and Leon makes his way to the engine room to investigate its source. He finds out that the BOW destroyed the fuel converter in an attempt to blow up the ship and destroy all evidence. He successfully fights it off, but the damage done to the ship is too severe.

The scene then shifts to the submarine, where Barry reveals to the captain that he pretended to abduct Lucia to trick Umbrella into evacuating them from the Starlight. He also learns that the company knew nothing of the BOW on the Starlight and wants Lucia, as she is the host of a parasite, which grows into another BOW within ten days. Barry forces the surgeons on board to remove the parasite from the girl, but it breaks free from the containment glass and drains the life from the captain, turning him into a zombie. The parasite escapes, kills the whole crew and eventually turns into a mature BOW. Barry and Lucia navigate the submarine back and board the near-sunk ship in order to rescue Leon, but the grown-up monster goes ahead of them. Although they quickly discover what appears to be Leon, the two find out that the BOW is actually a shape-shifter and that it has assumed the form of their partner. They manage to escape and come across another Leon in the engine room. Together, the three go back to the deck, where the BOW pulls Lucia into the sea. Barry rescues her, but then another Lucia appears right behind them. The real girl grabs a knife and cuts her hand to show her red blood, thus confirming her identity. The group defeats the BOW in one last battle and escapes to the submarine. Lucia, having lost her mysterious powers with the parasite's extraction, is offered to live with Barry's family. In the game's final shot, Leon's neck is shown bleeding green blood, revealing him to be not the real Leon but the first BOW in disguise, now unable to be sensed by Lucia.

Development
While the technical implementation of the game was done by the now defunct British company M4, two employees of Capcom were involved with the development as well. Shinji Mikami served as an advisor for the game and the story was written by Hiroki Kato, the director of Resident Evil - Code: Veronica. The game's first-person combat was inspired by the 1987 role-playing video game Dungeon Master.

Reception

Resident Evil Gaiden received generally mixed reviews from critics. Mike Major of GamePro remarked that the visual presentation detracts from the intended creepy atmosphere. IGN's Craig Harris criticized the game's unpractical save system for a handheld game (the player can save only at limited save points) and was unsatisfied with the puzzles being reduced to collecting keys and items. GameSpot's Frank Provo addressed the same issues in their review, though they applauded the clever storyline for its many twists and turns. Computer and Video Games also criticized the graphics, but found the puzzles to be on par with that of other installments in the series, and commended the battle system. Retro Gamer included it on their list of top ten Game Boy Color games as a "superb actioner with a gripping storyline" and "an underrated classic."

Notes

References

External links
 

2001 video games
Action-adventure games
Game Boy Color games
Game Boy Color-only games
Single-player video games
Video games set in 1998
Virgin Interactive games
Resident Evil spin-off games
Video games developed in the United Kingdom